Stasinė (formerly ) is a village in Kėdainiai district municipality, in Kaunas County, in central Lithuania. According to the 2011 census, the village had a population of 100 people. There is a former manor with the remaining 19th century barn, ice house and forge.

The name of the village comes from Stanislaw Kognowicki who was a landlord in Lačiūnava.

Demography

References

Villages in Kaunas County
Kėdainiai District Municipality